Dinabad may refer to:
 Dinabad, East Azerbaijan
 Dinabad, Hormozgan